Surveillance capitalism is a concept in political economics which denotes the widespread collection and commodification of personal data by corporations. This phenomenon is distinct from government surveillance, though the two can reinforce each other. The concept of surveillance capitalism, as described by Shoshana Zuboff, is driven by a profit-making incentive, and arose as advertising companies, led by Google's AdWords, saw the possibilities of using personal data to target consumers more precisely.

Increased data collection may have various advantages for individuals and society such as self-optimization (Quantified Self), societal optimizations (such as by smart cities) and optimized services (including various web applications). However, as Capitalism has become focused on expanding the proportion of social life that is open to data collection and data processing, these may come with significant implications for vulnerability and control of society as well as for privacy.

The role of social influence on human development has shown to affect all humans, at any age or from any background. The stages of cognitive development as put forth by Piaget include a preoperational stage in which the primary sources of social influence are parents, teachers, and siblings. In the subsequent stages, other sources become increasingly important. These can include constructed knowledge gatekeepers like schools, newspapers, or the internet. During this stage of development many children assign living attributes to nonliving things, This is called animism. This causes the child to attribute "The Internet" to being a real entity and they have an inability to distinguish between the content leading them to believe what "it" is telling them.

Economic pressures of capitalism are driving the intensification of connection and monitoring online with spaces of social life becoming open to saturation by corporate actors, directed at the making of profit and/or the regulation of action. Therefore, personal data points increased in value after the possibilities of targeted advertising were known. Consequently, the increasing price of data has limited accessibility to the purchase of personal data points to the richest in society.

Background 
Shoshana Zuboff writes that "analysing massive data sets began as a way to reduce uncertainty by discovering the probabilities of future patterns in the behavior of people and systems". In 2014 Vincent Mosco referred to the marketing of information about customers and subscribers to advertisers as surveillance capitalism and makes note of the surveillance state alongside it. Christian Fuchs found that the surveillance state fuses with surveillance capitalism. Similarly, Zuboff informs that the issue is further complicated by highly invisible collaborative arrangements with state security apparatuses. According to Trebor Scholz, companies recruit people as informants for this type of capitalism. Zuboff contrasts mass production of industrial capitalism with surveillance capitalism with the former being interdependent with its populations who were its consumers and employees and the latter preying on dependent populations who are neither its consumers nor its employees and largely ignorant of its procedures. Their research is demonstrating that the capitalist addition to analysing massive data sets has given its beginning purpose an unexpected turn. Surveillance has been changing power structures in the information economy, potentially shifting the balance of power further from nation-states and towards large corporations employing the surveillance capitalist logic

Zuboff notes that surveillance capitalism reaches beyond the conventional institutional terrain of the private firm and accumulates not only surveillance assets and capital, but also rights and operates without meaningful mechanisms of consent. In other words, analysing massive data sets was at some point not only executed by the state apparatuses but also companies. In Zuboff's research she claims that the two companies; Google and Facebook invented and transferred surveillance capitalism into "a new logic of accumulation". This mutation entailed both companies gathering very large numbers of data points about their users, with the core purpose of making profit. By selling these data points to external users (particularly advertisers) it has become an economic mechanism. The combination of the analysis of massive data sets and using those data sets as a market mechanism, has shaped the concept of surveillance capitalism. Surveillance capitalism has been heralded the successor to neoliberalism.

Oliver Stone, creator of the film Snowden, pointed to the location-based game Pokémon Go as the "latest sign of the emerging phenomenon and demonstration of surveillance capitalism". Stone criticised the game on the grounds that the location of its users was used not only for game purposes, but also to retrieve more information about its players. By tracking users' locations, the game collected far more information than just users' names and locations: "it can access the contents of your USB storage, your accounts, photographs, network connections, and phone activities, and can even activate your phone, when it is in standby mode". This data can then be analysed and commodified by companies such as Google (who significantly invested in the game's development) to improve the effectiveness of targeted advertisement.

Another aspect of surveillance capitalism relates to the influence it has had on political campaigning. Personal data retrieved by data miners can enable various companies (most notoriously, Cambridge Analytica) to improve the targeting of political advertising, a step beyond the commercial ends of previous Surveillance Capitalist operations. In this way, it is possible that political parties will be able to produce far more finely targeted political advertising, to maximise its impact on the electorate. However, Cory Doctorow writes that misuse of these data sets "will lead us towards totalitarianism". This may resemble a corporatocracy, and Joseph Turow writes that "centrality of corporate power is a direct reality at the very heart of the digital age".

Theory

Shoshana Zuboff 

In Zuboff's theory, surveillance capitalism is a novel market form and a specific logic of capitalist accumulation. In her 2014 essay A Digital Declaration: Big Data as Surveillance Capitalism, she characterized it as a "radically disembedded and extractive variant of information capitalism" based on the commodification of "reality" and its transformation into behavioral data for analysis and sales.

In a subsequent 2015 article, Zuboff analyzed the societal implications of this mutation of capitalism. She differentiated "surveillance assets", "surveillance capital", and "surveillance capitalism" and their dependence on a global architecture of computer mediation that she calls "Big Other", a distributed and largely uncontested new expression of power which constitutes hidden mechanisms of extraction, commodification, and control that threatens core values such as freedom, democracy, and privacy.

According to Zuboff, surveillance capitalism was pioneered at Google and later Facebook, in much the same way that mass-production and managerial capitalism were pioneered at Ford and General Motors a century earlier, and has now become the dominant form of information capitalism.

In her Oxford University lecture published in 2016, Zuboff identified surveillance capitalism's mechanisms and practices, including the manufacture of "prediction products" for sale in new "behavioral futures markets." She introduced the concept "dispossession by surveillance" and argued that it challenges the psychological and political bases of self-determination as it concentrates rights in the surveillance regime. This is described as a "coup from above."

Key features 
Zuboff's book The Age of Surveillance Capitalism  is a detailed examination of the unprecedented power of surveillance capitalism and the quest by powerful corporations to predict and control human behavior. Zuboff identifies four key features in the logic of surveillance capitalism and explicitly follows the four key features identified by Google's chief economist, Hal Varian:

 The drive toward more and more data extraction and analysis.
 The development of new contractual forms using computer-monitoring and automation.
 The desire to personalize and customize the services offered to users of digital platforms.
 The use of the technological infrastructure to carry out continual experiments on its users and consumers.

Analysis 
Zuboff compares demanding privacy from surveillance capitalists or lobbying for an end to commercial surveillance on the Internet to asking Henry Ford to make each Model T by hand and states that such demands are existential threats that violate the basic mechanisms of the entity's survival.

Zuboff warns that principles of self-determination might be forfeited due to "ignorance, learned helplessness, inattention, inconvenience, habituation, or drift" and states that "we tend to rely on mental models, vocabularies, and tools distilled from past catastrophes," referring to the twentieth century's totalitarian nightmares or the monopolistic predations of Gilded Age capitalism, with countermeasures that have been developed to fight those earlier threats not being sufficient or even appropriate to meet the novel challenges.

She also poses the question: "will we be the masters of information, or will we be its slaves?" and states that "if the digital future is to be our home, then it is we who must make it so".

In her book, Zuboff discusses the differences between industrial capitalism and surveillance capitalism. Zuboff writes that as industrial capitalism exploited nature, surveillance capitalism exploits human nature.

John Bellamy Foster and Robert W. McChesney 
The term "surveillance capitalism" has also been used by political economists John Bellamy Foster and Robert W. McChesney, although with a different meaning. In an article published in Monthly Review in 2014, they apply it to describe the manifestation of the "insatiable need for data" of financialization, which they explain is "the long-term growth speculation on financial assets relative to GDP" introduced in the United States by industry and government in the 1980s that evolved out of the military-industrial complex and the advertising industry.

Response 
Numerous organizations have been struggling for free speech and privacy rights in the new surveillance capitalism and various national governments have enacted privacy laws. It is also conceivable that new capabilities and uses for mass-surveillance require structural changes towards a new system to prevent misuse. Government attention towards the dangers of surveillance capitalism especially increased after the exposure of the Facebook-Cambridge Analytica data scandal that occurred in early 2018. In response to the misuse of mass-surveillance multiple states have taken preventive measures. The European Union, for example, has reacted to these events and restricted its rules and regulations on misusing big data. Surveillance-Capitalism has become a lot harder under these rules, known as the General Data Protection Regulations. However, implementing preventative measures against misuse of mass-surveillance is hard for many countries as it requires structural change of the system.

Bruce Sterling's 2014 lecture at Strelka Institute "The epic struggle of the internet of things" explained how consumer products could become surveillance objects that track people's everyday life. In his talk, Sterling highlights the alliances between multinational corporations who develop Internet of Things-based surveillance systems which feeds surveillance capitalism.

In 2015, Tega Brain and Surya Mattu's satirical artwork Unfit Bits encourages users to subvert fitness data collected by Fitbits. They suggested ways to fake datasets by attaching the device, for example to a metronome or on a bicycle wheel. In 2018, Brain created a project with Sam Lavigne called New Organs which collect people's stories of being monitored online and offline.

The 2019 documentary film The Great Hack tells the story of how a company named Cambridge Analytica used Facebook to manipulate the 2016 U.S. presidential election. Extensive profiling of users and news feeds that are ordered by black box algorithms were presented as the main source of the problem, which is also mentioned in Zuboff's book.

Persistence 
Although there has been a large response since Zuboff's book, it will be difficult to end surveillance capitalism in the current digital and political sphere due to the power that large technology companies have politically and economically. Because of this, it is more likely that we will see governments adopting surveillance capitalism for their own benefit, creating deals with these large technology companies, in order to both monitor and gain advantage of its going on. As Fukuyama et al said, “No liberal democracy is content to entrust concentrated political power to individuals based on assumptions about their good intentions.”

Another way in which it could be demonstrated that surveillance capitalism has become almost inevitably ingrained within most if not all forms of government and society is through the lens of China. China has “largest population of mobile phone, internet and social media users” and yet Google and Meta have no hand in this. Despite their lack of influence, China's government is well known for tracking the digital footprint of its citizens. Even though this is due to them viewing the digital space as a "national resource" it does not change the fact that it is still an extremely high-functioning form of surveillance capitalism, which ultimately shows the power in which governments could have should they choose to adopt a similar level of interest in the digital footprints of their citizens.

See also 
 Commercialization of the Internet
 Criticism of capitalism
 Data mining
 Five Eyes
 Free and open-source software
 Googlization
 Mass surveillance industry
 
 Targeted advertising
 Personalized marketing
 Platform capitalism 
 Privacy concerns with social networking services

References

Further reading

External links 
 Shoshana Zuboff Keynote: Reality is the Next Big Thing, YouTube, Elevate Festival, 2014
 Big Other: Surveillance Capitalism and the Prospects of an Information Civilization, Shoshana Zuboff
 Capitalism's New Clothes, Evgeny Morozov, The Baffler (4 February 2019)

Surveillance
Capitalism
History of the Internet
Mass surveillance
Market research
Big data
Tracking